This is a list of the mammal species recorded in Sierra Leone. Of the mammal species in Sierra Leone, six are endangered, nine are vulnerable, and four are near threatened.

The following tags are used to highlight each species' conservation status as assessed by the International Union for Conservation of Nature:

Some species were assessed using an earlier set of criteria. Species assessed using this system have the following instead of near threatened and least concern categories:

Order: Tubulidentata (aardvarks) 

The order Tubulidentata consists of a single species, the aardvark. Tubulidentata are characterised by their teeth which lack a pulp cavity and form thin tubes which are continuously worn down and replaced.

Family: Orycteropodidae
 Genus: Orycteropus
 Aardvark, O. afer

Order: Hyracoidea (hyraxes) 

The hyraxes are any of four species of fairly small, thickset, herbivorous mammals in the order Hyracoidea. About the size of a domestic cat they are well-furred, with rounded bodies and a stumpy tail. They are native to Africa and the Middle East.

Family: Procaviidae (hyraxes)
 Genus: Dendrohyrax
 Western tree hyrax, D. dorsalis

Order: Proboscidea (elephants) 

The elephants comprise three living species and are the largest living land animals.

Family: Elephantidae (elephants)
 Genus: Loxodonta
African forest elephant, L. cyclotis

Order: Sirenia (manatees and dugongs) 

Sirenia is an order of fully aquatic, herbivorous mammals that inhabit rivers, estuaries, coastal marine waters, swamps, and marine wetlands. All four species are endangered.

Family: Trichechidae
 Genus: Trichechus
 African manatee, Trichechus senegalensis VU

Order: Primates 

The order Primates contains humans and their closest relatives: lemurs, lorisoids, tarsiers, monkeys, and apes.

Suborder: Strepsirrhini
Infraorder: Lemuriformes
Superfamily: Lorisoidea
Family: Lorisidae (lorises, bushbabies)
 Genus: Perodicticus
 Potto, Perodicticus potto LR/lc
Family: Galagidae
 Genus: Galagoides
 Prince Demidoff's bushbaby, Galago demidovii LR/lc
 Thomas's bushbaby, Galago thomasi LR/lc
 Genus: Galago
 Senegal bushbaby, Galago senegalensis LR/lc
Suborder: Haplorhini
Infraorder: Simiiformes
Parvorder: Catarrhini
Superfamily: Cercopithecoidea
Family: Cercopithecidae (Old World monkeys)
 Genus: Erythrocebus
 Patas monkey, Erythrocebus patas LR/lc
 Genus: Chlorocebus
 Green monkey, Chlorocebus sabaeus LR/lc
 Genus: Cercopithecus
 Campbell's mona monkey, Cercopithecus campbelli LR/lc
 Diana monkey, Cercopithecus diana EN
 Lesser spot-nosed monkey, Cercopithecus petaurista LR/lc
 Genus: Papio
 Olive baboon, Papio anubis LR/lc
 Guinea baboon, Papio papio LR/nt
 Genus: Cercocebus
 Sooty mangabey, Cercocebus atys LR/nt
 Collared mangabey, Cercocebus torquatus LR/nt
Subfamily: Colobinae
 Genus: Colobus
 King colobus, Colobus polykomos LR/nt
 Genus: Procolobus
 Red colobus, Procolobus badius EN
 Olive colobus, Procolobus verus LR/nt
Superfamily: Hominoidea
Family: Hominidae (great apes)
Subfamily: Homininae
Tribe: Panini
 Genus: Pan
 Common chimpanzee, Pan troglodytes EN

Order: Rodentia (rodents) 

Rodents make up the largest order of mammals, with over 40% of mammalian species. They have two incisors in the upper and lower jaw which grow continually and must be kept short by gnawing.

Suborder: Hystricomorpha
Family: Hystricidae (Old World porcupines)
Genus: Atherurus
 African brush-tailed porcupine, Atherurus africanus LC
Genus: Hystrix
 Crested porcupine, Hystrix cristata LC
Suborder: Anomaluromorpha
Family: Anomaluridae
Subfamily: Anomalurinae
Genus: Anomalurus
 Lord Derby's scaly-tailed squirrel, Anomalurus derbianus LC
 Genus: Anomalurops
 Beecroft's scaly-tailed squirrel, Anomalurops beecrofti LC
Subfamily: Zenkerellinae
Genus: Idiurus
 Long-eared flying mouse, Idiurus macrotis LC
Suborder Sciuromorpha
Family: Sciuridae (squirrels)
Subfamily: Xerinae
Tribe: Xerini
Genus: Xerus
 Striped ground squirrel, Xerus erythropus LC
Tribe: Protoxerini
Genus: Epixerus
 Western palm squirrel, Epixerus ebii DD
Genus: Funisciurus
 Fire-footed rope squirrel, Funisciurus pyrropus LC
Genus: Heliosciurus
 Gambian sun squirrel, Heliosciurus gambianus LC
 Small sun squirrel, Heliosciurus punctatus DD
 Red-legged sun squirrel, Heliosciurus rufobrachium LC
Genus: Paraxerus
 Green bush squirrel, Paraxerus poensis LC
Genus: Protoxerus
 Slender-tailed squirrel, Protoxerus aubinnii DD
 Forest giant squirrel, Protoxerus stangeri LC
Family: Gliridae (dormice)
Subfamily: Graphiurinae
Genus: Graphiurus
 Jentink's dormouse, Graphiurus crassicaudatus DD
 Lorrain dormouse, Graphiurus lorraineus LC
 Nagtglas's African dormouse, Graphiurus nagtglasii LC
Suborder Myomorpha
Family: Nesomyidae
Subfamily: Cricetomyinae
Genus: Cricetomys
 Emin's pouched rat, Cricetomys emini LC
Family: Muridae (mice, rats, gerbils, etc.)
Subfamily: Deomyinae
Genus: Lophuromys
 Rusty-bellied brush-furred rat, Lophuromys sikapusi LC
Genus: Uranomys
 Rudd's mouse, Uranomys ruddi LC
Subfamily: Gerbillinae
Genus: Gerbilliscus
 Guinean gerbil, Gerbilliscus guineae LC
 Kemp's gerbil, Gerbilliscus kempi LC
Subfamily: Murinae
Genus: Arvicanthis
 African grass rat, Arvicanthis niloticus LC
 Guinean grass rat, Arvicanthis rufinus LC
Genus: Dasymys
 West African shaggy rat, Dasymys rufulus LC
Genus: Dephomys
 Defua rat, Dephomys defua LC
Genus: Grammomys
 Bunting's thicket rat, Grammomys buntingi DD
Genus: Hybomys
 Miller's striped mouse, Hybomys planifrons LC
 Temminck's striped mouse, Hybomys trivirgatus LC
Genus: Hylomyscus
 Allen's wood mouse, Hylomyscus alleni LC
 Baer's wood mouse, Hylomyscus baeri EN
Genus: Lemniscomys
 Bellier's striped grass mouse, Lemniscomys bellieri LC
 Typical striped grass mouse, Lemniscomys striatus LC
Genus: Malacomys
 Edward's swamp rat, Malacomys edwardsi LC
Genus: Mastomys
 Guinea multimammate mouse, Mastomys erythroleucus LC
 Natal multimammate mouse, Mastomys natalensis LC
Genus: Mus
 Baoule's mouse, Mus baoulei LC
 African pygmy mouse, Mus minutoides LC
 Peters's mouse, Mus setulosus LC
Genus: Oenomys
 Ghana rufous-nosed rat, Oenomys ornatus DD
Genus: Praomys
 Dalton's mouse, Praomys daltoni LC
 Tullberg's soft-furred mouse, Praomys tullbergi LC

Order: Lagomorpha (lagomorphs) 

The lagomorphs comprise two families, Leporidae (hares and rabbits), and Ochotonidae (pikas). Though they can resemble rodents, and were classified as a superfamily in that order until the early 20th century, they have since been considered a separate order. They differ from rodents in a number of physical characteristics, such as having four incisors in the upper jaw rather than two.

Family: Leporidae (rabbits, hares)
 Genus: Lepus
 African savanna hare, Lepus microtis LR/lc

Order: Erinaceomorpha (hedgehogs and gymnures) 

The order Erinaceomorpha contains a single family, Erinaceidae, which comprise the hedgehogs and gymnures. The hedgehogs are easily recognised by their spines while gymnures look more like large rats.

Family: Erinaceidae (hedgehogs)
Subfamily: Erinaceinae
 Genus: Atelerix
 Four-toed hedgehog, Atelerix albiventris LR/lc

Order: Soricomorpha (shrews, moles, and solenodons) 

The "shrew-forms" are insectivorous mammals. The shrews and solenodons closely resemble mice while the moles are stout-bodied burrowers.

Family: Soricidae (shrews)
Subfamily: Crocidurinae
Genus: Crocidura
 Buettikofer's shrew, Crocidura buettikoferi LC
 Crosse's shrew, Crocidura crossei LC
 Dent's shrew, Crocidura denti LC
 Bicolored musk shrew, Crocidura fuscomurina LC
 Lamotte's shrew, Crocidura lamottei LC
 Mauritanian shrew, Crocidura lusitania LC
 West African long-tailed shrew, Crocidura muricauda LC
 Nimba shrew, Crocidura nimbae VU
 West African pygmy shrew, Crocidura obscurior LC
 African giant shrew, Crocidura olivieri LC
 Fraser's musk shrew, Crocidura poensis LC
 Therese's shrew, Crocidura theresae LC
Genus: Sylvisorex
 Climbing shrew, Sylvisorex megalura LC

Order: Chiroptera (bats) 

The bats' most distinguishing feature is that their forelimbs are developed as wings, making them the only mammals capable of flight. Bat species account for about 20% of all mammals.

Family: Pteropodidae (flying foxes, Old World fruit bats)
Subfamily: Pteropodinae
Genus: Eidolon
 Straw-coloured fruit bat, Eidolon helvum LC
Genus: Epomophorus
 Gambian epauletted fruit bat, Epomophorus gambianus LC
Genus: Epomops
 Buettikofer's epauletted fruit bat, Epomops buettikoferi LC
Genus: Hypsignathus
 Hammer-headed bat, Hypsignathus monstrosus LC
Genus: Lissonycteris
 Smith's fruit bat, Lissonycteris smithi LC
Genus: Micropteropus
 Peters's dwarf epauletted fruit bat, Micropteropus pusillus LC
Genus: Myonycteris
 Little collared fruit bat, Myonycteris torquata LC
Genus: Nanonycteris
 Veldkamp's dwarf epauletted fruit bat, Nanonycteris veldkampi LC
Genus: Rousettus
 Egyptian fruit bat, Rousettus aegyptiacus LC
Subfamily: Macroglossinae
Genus: Megaloglossus
 Woermann's bat, Megaloglossus woermanni LC
Family: Vespertilionidae
Subfamily: Myotinae
Genus: Myotis
 Rufous mouse-eared bat, Myotis bocagii LC
Subfamily: Vespertilioninae
Genus: Glauconycteris
 Abo bat, Glauconycteris poensis LC
Genus: Mimetillus
 Moloney's mimic bat, Mimetillus moloneyi LC
Genus: Neoromicia
 Dark-brown serotine, Neoromicia brunneus NT
 Cape serotine, Neoromicia capensis LC
 Banana pipistrelle, Neoromicia nanus LC
 Rendall's serotine, Neoromicia rendalli LC
 Somali serotine, Neoromicia somalicus LC
 White-winged serotine, Neoromicia tenuipinnis LC
Genus: Pipistrellus
 Aellen's pipistrelle, Pipistrellus inexspectatus DD
 Tiny pipistrelle, Pipistrellus nanulus LC
Genus: Scotoecus
 Light-winged lesser house bat, Scotoecus albofuscus DD
 Dark-winged lesser house bat, Scotoecus hirundo DD
Genus: Scotophilus
 African yellow bat, Scotophilus dinganii LC
 White-bellied yellow bat, Scotophilus leucogaster LC
 Nut-colored yellow bat, Scotophilus nux LC
Subfamily: Miniopterinae
Genus: Miniopterus
 Common bent-wing bat, Miniopterus schreibersii LC
Family: Molossidae
Genus: Chaerephon
 Gland-tailed free-tailed bat, Chaerephon bemmeleni LC
 Little free-tailed bat, Chaerephon pumila LC
Genus: Mops
 Sierra Leone free-tailed bat, Mops brachypterus LC
 Angolan free-tailed bat, Mops condylurus LC
 Dwarf free-tailed bat, Mops nanulus LC
 Spurrell's free-tailed bat, Mops spurrelli LC
 Railer bat, Mops thersites LC
Family: Emballonuridae
Genus: Taphozous
 Mauritian tomb bat, Taphozous mauritianus LC
Family: Nycteridae
Genus: Nycteris
 Bate's slit-faced bat, Nycteris arge LC
 Gambian slit-faced bat, Nycteris gambiensis LC
 Large slit-faced bat, Nycteris grandis LC
 Hairy slit-faced bat, Nycteris hispida LC
 Large-eared slit-faced bat, Nycteris macrotis LC
 Egyptian slit-faced bat, Nycteris thebaica LC
Family: Megadermatidae
Genus: Lavia
 Yellow-winged bat, Lavia frons LC
Family: Rhinolophidae
Subfamily: Rhinolophinae
Genus: Rhinolophus
 Halcyon horseshoe bat, Rhinolophus alcyone LC
 Rüppell's horseshoe bat, Rhinolophus fumigatus LC
 Guinean horseshoe bat, Rhinolophus guineensis VU
 Lander's horseshoe bat, Rhinolophus landeri LC
Subfamily: Hipposiderinae
Genus: Hipposideros
 Aba roundleaf bat, Hipposideros abae NT
 Benito roundleaf bat, Hipposideros beatus LC
 Sundevall's roundleaf bat, Hipposideros caffer LC
 Cyclops roundleaf bat, Hipposideros cyclops LC
 Sooty roundleaf bat, Hipposideros fuliginosus NT
 Giant roundleaf bat, Hipposideros gigas LC
 Jones's roundleaf bat, Hipposideros jonesi NT
 Noack's roundleaf bat, Hipposideros ruber LC

Order: Pholidota (pangolins) 

The order Pholidota comprises the eight species of pangolin. Pangolins are anteaters and have the powerful claws, elongated snout and long tongue seen in the other unrelated anteater species.

Family: Manidae
 Genus: Manis
 Giant pangolin, Manis gigantea LR/lc
 Long-tailed pangolin, Manis tetradactyla LR/lc
 Tree pangolin, Manis tricuspis LR/lc

Order: Cetacea (whales) 

The order Cetacea includes whales, dolphins and porpoises. They are the mammals most fully adapted to aquatic life with a spindle-shaped nearly hairless body, protected by a thick layer of blubber, and forelimbs and tail modified to provide propulsion underwater.

Suborder: Mysticeti
Family: Balaenopteridae
Subfamily: Balaenopterinae
 Genus: Balaenoptera
 Common minke whale, Balaenoptera acutorostrata VU
 Sei whale, Balaenoptera borealis EN
 Bryde's whale, Balaenoptera brydei EN
 Blue whale, Balaenoptera musculus EN
 Fin whale, Balaenoptera physalus EN
Subfamily: Megapterinae
 Genus: Megaptera
 Humpback whale, Megaptera novaeangliae VU
Suborder: Odontoceti
Superfamily: Platanistoidea
Family: Phocoenidae
 Genus: Phocoena
 Harbour porpoise, Phocoena phocoena VU
Family: Physeteridae
 Genus: Physeter
 Sperm whale, Physeter macrocephalus VU
Family: Kogiidae
 Genus: Kogia
 Pygmy sperm whale, Kogia breviceps DD
 Dwarf sperm whale, Kogia sima DD
Family: Ziphidae
 Genus: Mesoplodon
 Blainville's beaked whale, Mesoplodon densirostris DD
 Gervais' beaked whale, Mesoplodon europaeus DD
 Genus: Ziphius
 Cuvier's beaked whale, Ziphius cavirostris DD
Family: Delphinidae (marine dolphins)
 Genus: Orcinus
 Killer whale, Orcinus orca DD
 Genus: Feresa
 Pygmy killer whale, Feresa attenuata DD
 Genus: Pseudorca
 False killer whale, Pseudorca crassidens DD
 Genus: Delphinus
 Short-beaked common dolphin, Delphinus delphis LR/cd
 Genus: Lagenodelphis
 Fraser's dolphin, Lagenodelphis hosei DD
 Genus: Stenella
 Pantropical spotted dolphin, Stenella attenuata LR/cd
 Clymene dolphin, Stenella clymene DD
 Striped dolphin, Stenella coeruleoalba DD
 Atlantic spotted dolphin, Stenella frontalis DD
 Spinner dolphin, Stenella longirostris LR/cd
 Genus: Steno
 Rough-toothed dolphin, Steno bredanensis DD
 Genus: Tursiops
 Common bottlenose dolphin, Tursiops truncatus LC
 Genus: Globicephala
 Short-finned pilot whale, Globicephala macrorhynchus DD
 Genus: Grampus
 Risso's dolphin, Grampus griseus DD
 Genus: Peponocephala
 Melon-headed whale, Peponocephala electra DD

Order: Carnivora (carnivorans) 

There are over 260 species of carnivorans, the majority of which feed primarily on meat. They have a characteristic skull shape and dentition.
Suborder: Feliformia
Family: Felidae (cats)
Subfamily: Felinae
 Genus: Leptailurus
 Serval, Leptailurus serval LC
 Genus: Caracal
African golden cat, C. aurata 
Subfamily: Pantherinae
 Genus: Panthera
 Leopard, Panthera pardus VU
Family: Viverridae
Subfamily: Viverrinae
 Genus: Civettictis
 African civet, Civettictis civetta LC
 Genus: Genetta
 Rusty-spotted genet, Genetta maculata LC
 Hausa genet, Genetta thierryi LC
 Genus: Poiana
 Leighton's linsang, Poiana leightoni VU
Family: Nandiniidae
 Genus: Nandinia
 African palm civet, Nandinia binotata LC
Family: Herpestidae (mongooses)
 Genus: Atilax
 Marsh mongoose, Atilax paludinosus LC
 Genus: Crossarchus
 Common kusimanse, Crossarchus obscurus LC
 Genus: Herpestes
 Egyptian mongoose, Herpestes ichneumon LC
Common slender mongoose, Herpestes sanguineus LC
 Genus: Ichneumia
 White-tailed mongoose, Ichneumia albicauda LC
 Genus: Mungos
 Gambian mongoose, Mungos gambianus LC
Family: Hyaenidae (hyaenas)
 Genus: Crocuta
 Spotted hyena, Crocuta crocuta LC
Suborder: Caniformia
Family: Canidae (dogs, foxes)
Genus: Lupulella
 Side-striped jackal, L. adusta  
Genus: Lycaon
 African wild dog, L. pictus  extirpated
Family: Mustelidae (mustelids)
 Genus: Ictonyx
 Striped polecat, Ictonyx striatus LC
 Genus: Mellivora
 Honey badger, Mellivora capensis LC
 Genus: Hydrictis
 Speckle-throated otter, H. maculicollis LC
 Genus: Aonyx
 African clawless otter, Aonyx capensis LC

Order: Artiodactyla (even-toed ungulates) 

The even-toed ungulates are ungulates whose weight is borne about equally by the third and fourth toes, rather than mostly or entirely by the third as in perissodactyls. There are about 220 artiodactyl species, including many that are of great economic importance to humans.

Family: Suidae (pigs)
Subfamily: Phacochoerinae
 Genus: Phacochoerus
 Common warthog, Phacochoerus africanus LR/lc
Subfamily: Suinae
 Genus: Hylochoerus
 Giant forest hog, Hylochoerus meinertzhageni LR/lc
Family: Hippopotamidae (hippopotamuses)
 Genus: Choeropsis
 Pygmy hippopotamus, Choeropsis liberiensis EN
 Genus: Hippopotamus
 Hippopotamus, Hippopotamus amphibius VU
Family: Tragulidae
 Genus: Hyemoschus
 Water chevrotain, Hyemoschus aquaticus DD
Family: Bovidae (cattle, antelope, sheep, goats)
Subfamily: Antilopinae
 Genus: Neotragus
 Royal antelope, Neotragus pygmaeus LR/nt
 Genus: Ourebia
 Oribi, Ourebia ourebi LR/cd
Subfamily: Bovinae
 Genus: Syncerus
 African buffalo, Syncerus caffer LR/cd
 Genus: Tragelaphus
 Bongo, Tragelaphus eurycerus LR/nt
 Bushbuck, Tragelaphus scriptus LR/lc
Subfamily: Cephalophinae
 Genus: Cephalophus
 Bay duiker, Cephalophus dorsalis LR/nt
 Jentink's duiker, Cephalophus jentinki VU
 Maxwell's duiker, Cephalophus maxwellii LR/nt
 Blue duiker, Cephalophus monticola LR/lc
 Black duiker, Cephalophus niger LR/nt
 Ogilby's duiker, Cephalophus ogilbyi LR/nt
 Red-flanked duiker, Cephalophus rufilatus LR/cd
 Yellow-backed duiker, Cephalophus silvicultor LR/nt
 Zebra duiker, Cephalophus zebra VU
 Genus: Sylvicapra
 Common duiker, Sylvicapra grimmia LR/lc
Subfamily: Reduncinae Genus: Kobus Waterbuck, Kobus ellipsiprymnus LR/cd
 Kob, Kobus kob'' LR/cd

See also
Wildlife of Sierra Leone

Notes

References
 

Sierra Leone
Sierra Leone
Mammals